Xplosion may refer to:

Impact Xplosion, an American TV series
Xplosión, a 1993 album by Vico C
"Xplosion", a song by OutKast from their 2000 album Stankonia